The New Zealand FM guards van is a rail vehicle in New Zealand originally used on freight trains but now used primarily on passenger trains, reclassified AG.

Introduction

First batch, 1977 

In the mid-1970s New Zealand Railways (NZR) had a need for new guards vans for new vans for both freight and moderately fast passenger and express freight services, to replace old and increasingly decrepit vans. Most of the existing vans were built before 1946, including passenger express vans, post-war construction being only two batches of 35 and 30 vans in 1955 and between 1963-1967.

The New Zealand Cabinet approval for made for the van order on 15 May 1973 and NZR General Manager T M Small made a second request to the Cabinet Works Committee for approval on 15 August 1974, but no work was made on design until 1975 due to the fact the NZR design staff were preoccupied with design of wagons and the reconstruction of the Northerner express. The first order for 56 FM vans was approved by the last Cabinet meeting of the Rowling Labour Government on 18 November 1975 for $4.32 million.

The vans were built by Mitsubishi and were the first all-steel vans. The body was composed of three modules that could be detached from the underframe: a central module, classed GM (guard's module), which contained the guard's office, five first-class seats and facilities; and two outer modules, classed LM (luggage module), for freight and luggage. The idea was that should a module become damaged in service it can be removed for repairs and replaced with another, allowing the van to return to service sooner than otherwise would have been the case. It was because of these modules that the vans were given the FM classification, as opposed to the traditional F designation given to all previous NZR guards vans. The FM also pioneered the X28020 bogie, now used under New Zealand's long-distance passenger fleet. The first batch was very well received by guards. Fifty-six were built, and in 1976 an order was placed for an additional 17.

Second batch, 1981 
In 1981, another batch of 50 vans was introduced, built by Daewoo in South Korea. Consideration was even given to using stainless steel bodies on the second batch, but the cost was considered impossible after the acceptance of treated anti-corrosion lower-grade steel for the New Zealand EM class electric multiple units.

In April 1983 the newly formed New Zealand Railways Corporation commissioned consultants Booz Allen Hamilton to review operations with a view of making the Corporation's services more efficient, they reported back in May 1984. Their conclusion was that the extra train weight, crewing and loss of revenue space on trains induced by the vans made the continued use of the guard's vans uneconomic and they should be withdrawn from freight trains. Among recommendations was reducing locomotive crews from two to one, and the replacement of guards and vans with Train End Monitors (TEMs).

Similar views on the obsolescence and extra cost of NZR use and order of guards van were made in an Railway Gazette International editorial at the time of the order. The editorial expressed the view it was an outrage these extravagant vans were being ordered so one man could ride around the country at the time secondary passenger services were being eliminated in New Zealand on a scale virtually unparalleled  in the western world. This latter recommendation led to the elimination of guards vans from all freight trains by 1987 (the last train with a van ran on 30 May 1987.) Consequently, the second batch of FM vans was redundant after only five years in service.

AG class vans
NZR began overhauling a small number of FM vans for use with 56ft carriages on the Blue Fern, Northerner and Overlander, Bay Express and Lynx Express, many rebuilt with air conditioning. These vans were fitted with either a small platform-mounted generator to supply 240 V power or a larger generator in one of the LM modules to supply the 240 V and also power for the air conditioning. On newer higher-powered vans one of the end platforms was given more substantial railings and gates for passenger use, and to separate the modified vans from the other FMs they were given the classification AG. Further conversions were performed with most getting the larger generator, and they soon became the new standard luggage van. There was some variation between vans, in the type, size and position of the generator.

In 1991, AG 124 was modified with one of the LM modules converted to provide greater outdoor accommodation for passengers, and both ends fitted with better railings. This van was for use on the TranzAlpine, where it proved extremely popular and a few years later AG 239, with a 110 kVA generator for air-conditioned cars, incorporated the same feature. In 1995 AG 239 had the other LM module modified to match, at the expense of any luggage carrying capacity, and a larger 175 kVA generator to reflect the increased work needed for the larger consist.

In 1998, AG 90, out of service since its involvement in the 25 August 1993 level crossing collision between the Southerner and a concrete mixer truck at Rolleston, was repaired and had a new 175 kVA generator installed, for duty on the TranzAlpine. This van is used in the middle of the train, to separate the increasingly lengthy TranzAlpine into two self-contained sections. In 1999, AG 199 was modified in a similar manner for the TranzCoastal, with one LM and the GM hollowed out for outdoor viewing and the other LM retained solely for luggage, with no generator. In 2008, AG 239 was modified to match AG 90 to provide a spare viewing car. No further vans have been modified in this manner.

21st century

AG 130 was modified for use with the S class carriages rebuilt from ex-British Rail Mark II carriages for the Capital Connection. Changes included fitting a wheelchair hoist in one of the LM modules and the covering-in of one of the balcony ends to replace luggage capacity lost by fitting the hoist.

Other vans were used with the first SA suburban sets for Auckland, to supply power before the arrival of SD carriages fitted with a generator and a driving cab, in Auckland Transport Blue with a gold stripe. After the arrival of the SD cars they were released back into the general pool, with two exceptions: AG 222 was further overhauled and painted as a spare generator and extra luggage capacity for Metlink's Wairarapa Connection trains; AG 118 moved to Dunedin with 13 ex-Wairarapa 56 ft carriages, leased to the Dunedin Railways minus bogies. It has been fitted with X25330 bogies and is used to supply head-end power to the cars.

Seven vans have been rebuilt at Hillside Workshops for use with new AK Class carriages: AG 55, AG 61, AG 101 and AG 216 as AKV viewing/generator vans AKV 39, AKV 26, AKV 13 and AKV 41, with a 220 kVA generator, a viewing deck and an interconnecting corridor past the generator compartment; AG 78, AG 124 and AG 245 (ex FM 186) as AKL luggage vans AKL 34, AKL 21 and AKL 19, retaining their X28020 bogies (not upgraded to the newer P13 bogies). In 2017, it was announced AGs 147 and 199 were chosen to be converted to AKV open-air viewing/generator vans. As of December 2017, both vans are currently undergoing conversion at Hutt Workshops.

A number of the vans have ended up in service for in KiwiRail's non-revenue fleet, for example, Research Test Car EA 7501, EBC 27 for the ballast cleaning support vehicles, ECL 58 for the concrete sleeper layer train, and ETR 17 as the radio test vehicle.

In preservation

A considerable number of FM vans were bought by heritage railways. At least three FMs have been returned to mainline use largely original form, with more expected in the near future. In addition, the Gisborne City Vintage Railway has two vans substantially modified to passenger carriages for mainline use. The three modules have been welded together to form a single body with passenger windows. Two similar vans were similarly converted for the Wairoa YMCA for envisaged passenger trains to their Opoutama camp. This project did not come to fruition. One of these vans has ended up with Gisborne City Vintage Railway and the other with Mainline Steam, where it has been fitted with a servery.

Mainline Steam also has a number of other FM vans to be used with its carriage fleet. One of these vans, at Plimmerton, has been modified with one of the LM modules converted to a viewing platform similar to the Tranz Scenic conversions. The GM module has been partitioned to accommodate a generator and a loco crew compartment, and the other LM left for luggage. Unlike the Tranz Scenic conversions, a corridor is provided for so that the van can be marshaled anywhere in the consist and allow passenger access through the train (an idea which has been borrowed for the new vans to go with the AK Class cars). This van is to be paired with Mainline Steam's British Rail Mark II carriage set.

See also 
 Guard's van

References

Citations

Bibliography

External links 
 New Zealand Railways Rolling Stock Lists - FM class Modular 1977

Railway coaches of New Zealand